Birzo Majeed Abdullah (born 5 March 1978) is an Iraqi Kurdish politician of the Movement for Change (Gorran).Abdullah was born in Erbil.

References

External links
Gorran
Dengi Amerka

1978 births
Living people
Iraqi Kurdistani politicians
Gorran Movement politicians
Members of the Kurdistan Region Parliament
People from Erbil